Martine Clozel (born 27 December 1955) is a scientist, entrepreneur and co-founder of Actelion and Idorsia.

Education and career 

Clozel studied at the University of Nancy and the University of California in San Francisco. She also attended further training in physiology and pharmacology at McGill University.

In 1997, she founded Actelion with her husband Jean-Paul Clozel. The company was sold in 2017 to the American pharmaceutical and consumer products company Johnson & Johnson for US$30 billion. Martine Clozel founded the pharmaceutical company Idorsia in 2017 and has since served as head of research. She is one of the most successful female company founders in Switzerland.

Awards 

 Officer of the Legion of Honour
 Prix Suisse Award

References

External links

Martine Clozel at Idorsia

20th-century Swiss businesspeople
University of California, San Francisco alumni
Université de Montréal alumni
Nancy-Université alumni
1955 births
Living people
21st-century Swiss businesspeople
20th-century Swiss businesswomen
21st-century Swiss businesswomen
Officiers of the Légion d'honneur